José Ivo Sartori (born 25 February 1948) is a Brazilian politician. He is a former city councilor and former mayor of Caxias do Sul and belongs to PMDB. He is married to Maria Helena Sartori, with whom he has two sons, Marcos and Carolina. He was the 38th Governor of Rio Grande do Sul from 2015 to 2019.

Biography
Sartori graduated in Philosophy at the University of Caxias do Sul. He began his political career in 1976 when he was elected alderman in Caxias do Sul. He won five consecutive terms for the state's Legislative Assembly from 1982 and was elected congressman in 2002. He was also state secretary of Labor and Social Welfare, between 1987 and 1988.

Sartori ran four times for mayor of Caxias do Sul, in 1992, 2000 and 2004, when he was elected with 52.43% in the second round.

In 2008, Sartori was reelected mayor of Caxias do Sul with 54.35% of the votes against 45.65% of the defeated candidate, former Mayor Pepe Vargas (PT).

As Mayor of Caxias do Sul, he acted strongly in the areas of health, traffic and safety, promoting buildings and Basic Health Units reforms, putting patrolling the streets, turning Caxias do Sul in the first city in Brazil to use the automated waste collection opening roads to relieve the traffic, among other measures.

References

Living people
1948 births
Governors of Rio Grande do Sul
Mayors of places in Brazil
Members of the Chamber of Deputies (Brazil) from Rio Grande do Sul
Members of the Legislative Assembly of Rio Grande do Sul
Brazilian people of Italian descent
Brazilian Democratic Movement politicians